Western Trails is a 1938 American Western film directed by George Waggner and written by Norton S. Parker. The film stars Bob Baker, Marjorie Reynolds, John Ridgely, Carlyle Moore Jr., Forrest Taylor, Franco Corsaro and Bob Burns. The film was released on June 1, 1938, by Universal Pictures.

Plot
While pursuing his father's killers, Bob Mason gets a gunshot wound, while recovering he is assisted by nurse Alice with whom his friend Ben is in love with. Bob discovers that the killer is Alice's brother Rudd and confronts him, however Rudd convinces Ben that Bob is stealing Alice for himself, so Ben removes the bullets from Bob's gun right before he faces off against Rudd.

Cast        
Bob Baker as Bob Mason
Marjorie Reynolds as Alice Gordon
John Ridgely as Ben McClure
Carlyle Moore Jr. as Rudd Gordon
Forrest Taylor as Williams
Franco Corsaro as Indian Joe 
Bob Burns as Dan 'Dad' Mason
Jack Rockwell as Bartender
Wimpy as Smoky 
Apache as Apache

References

External links
 

1938 films
American Western (genre) films
1938 Western (genre) films
Universal Pictures films
Films directed by George Waggner
American black-and-white films
1930s English-language films
1930s American films